Klaproth is a German surname. Notable people with the surname include:

Martin Heinrich Klaproth (1743–1817), German chemist
Klaproth (crater), lunar crater named after Martin Heinrich Klaproth
Julius Klaproth (1783–1835), German linguist, historian, ethnographer, author, Orientalist and explorer
Stephan Klapproth (1958), a Swiss journalist and television presenter

German-language surnames